Rebekah Victoria Neumann (née Paltrow; born February 26, 1978) is an American businesswoman. Until September 22, 2019, she served as chief brand and impact officer at WeWork, a company founded by her husband, Adam Neumann, and oversaw its education program WeGrow.

Early life and education 
Neumann, the daughter of Evelyn and Bob Paltrow, grew up in Bedford, New York, and attended the Horace Mann School. Her father had a direct mail business and spent a number of years in prison for tax evasion.

She went on to study business and Buddhism at Cornell University. She later became a certified Jivamukti yoga instructor. She received her yoga instructor certification from the Omega Institute for Holistic Studies. She is a first cousin of actress Gwyneth Paltrow. Neumann is of Jewish descent and practices the faith. When she started her yoga training, Rebekah went by the nickname Rebi.

Career 
After graduating from college, Neumann entered Salomon Smith Barney's Sales and Trading Program, now known as Morgan Stanley Wealth Management. In the early 2010s, she acted and produced some short films using the screen name Rebekah Keith.

In 2010, her husband, Adam Neumann, and Miguel McKelvey co-founded WeWork. In 2019 Rebekah Neumann began calling herself a cofounder of WeWork.

According to Vanity Fair at WeWork "she has been known to have people fired, such as a mechanic for WeWork’s Gulfstream jet, within minutes of meeting them because she didn’t like their energy." In September 2019, after an attempt to take the company public revealed deepening financial issues, it was announced that Rebekah Neumann would step down as CEO of WeGrow and relinquish her role in The We Company. Rebekah Neumann played a key role in the collapse of the IPO having contributed New Age language in the filing which as a result "read like a novel written by someone who was 'shrooming", according to Scott Galloway.

She founded WeGrow, a private school in Chelsea, in 2017.

In October 2019, it was announced that the WeGrow school would close at the end of the academic year.

Since the collapse of WeWork and associated companies it has been discovered that Rebekah Neumann played a key role in WeWork’s downfall.

In 2020, Neumann bought back some of WeGrow's assets and started Student of Life for Life (SOLFL).

Personal life 
Rebekah and Israeli entrepreneur Adam Neumann met in New York and married in 2008. They have six children.

Neumann has come under criticism for endorsing pseudosciencific beliefs, such as the idea that meat has emotional memory that can be passed on through consumption.

In popular culture 
In the Apple TV+ series WeCrashed (2022), Rebekah Neumann is portrayed by Anne Hathaway. Neumann also appears in the nonfiction book Billion Dollar Loser (2020).

Filmography

Film

Short Film

References

Further reading 
 

Living people
1978 births
American Jews
American women chief executives
Businesspeople from New York (state)
Cornell University alumni
Horace Mann School alumni
People from Bedford, New York
WeWork people
21st-century American businesspeople
21st-century American businesswomen